Himantopterus fuscinervis is a moth in the family Himantopteridae. It was described by Constantin Wesmael in 1836. It is found on Sumatra and Java and in Malaysia.

The larvae have been recorded feeding on Shorea platyclados.

References

Moths described in 1836
Himantopteridae